The High Commissioner of Australia to Niue is an officer of the Australian Department of Foreign Affairs and Trade and the head of the High Commission of the Commonwealth of Australia in Niue. The position has the rank and status of an Ambassador Extraordinary and Plenipotentiary and the high commissioner resides in Alofi. The High Commissioner, since February 2022, is Louise Ellerton.

Posting history

On 27 February 2014 Australia formally established diplomatic relations with Niue, a self-governing state since 1974 in free association with New Zealand, with the non-resident high commissioner in Wellington also serving as high commissioner to Niue. In November 2018, Prime Minister Scott Morrison announced an expansion of Australia's diplomatic representation to all members of the Pacific Islands Forum, including opening a new high commission in the Cook Islands and Niue. The first resident high commissioner, Susan Allen, took office in Alofi on 26 August 2020.

Heads of mission

See also

 Australia–New Zealand relations
 Foreign relations of Niue
 Foreign relations of Australia

References

External links

Australian High Commission, Alofi

Australia and the Commonwealth of Nations
Niue and the Commonwealth of Nations
 
Niue
Australia